Following is a list of military operations of the Israeli–Palestinian conflict:

Al-Aqsa Intifada
 2002: Operation Defensive Shield
 2002: Operation Determined Path
 2004 May: Operation Rainbow (2004)
 2004: Raid on Beit Hanoun (2004); Operation Forward Shield
 2004 September: Operation Days of Penitence
 2005: (Israeli disengagement from Gaza)

Gaza–Israel conflict
The following lists the consecutive operations of the Gaza–Israel conflict:
 2006: Operation Summer Rains
 2006: Gaza beach explosion (2006)
 2006: 2006 Israel-Gaza conflict
 2006: 2006 shelling of Beit Hanoun
 2006 November: Operation Autumn Clouds
 2008: Beit Hanoun April 2008 incident
 2008 February: Operation Hot Winter
 2008: (2008 Israel–Hamas ceasefire not an attack; ended November 4th, 2008)
 2008-2009: Gaza War (2008–09)
 2009: List of Israeli attacks on Gaza, 2009
 2010: March 2010 Israel–Gaza clashes
 2010 May: Gaza flotilla raid (in international waters)
 2011: August 2011 Gaza Strip air raids
 2012 March: March 2012 Gaza–Israel clashes; Operation Returning Echo
 2012: Operation Pillar of Defense
 2014: 2014 Israel–Gaza conflict
 2015: 2015–2016 wave of violence in Israeli-Palestinian conflict
 2018: Gaza–Israel clashes (November 2018)
 2021: 2021 Israel–Palestine crisis
 2022: Operation Breaking Dawn

See also
Casualties of Israeli attacks on the Gaza Strip
Timeline of the Israeli–Palestinian conflict
Palestinian political violence
List of the Israel Defense Forces operations
Palestinian rocket attacks on Israel
List of Palestinian suicide attacks
List of Palestinian rocket attacks on Israel
Palestinian animal bomb attacks
Targeted killings by Israel Defense Forces

 
Israeli–Palestinian conflict-related lists